Pleocnemia is a genus of ferns in the family Dryopteridaceae, subfamily Elaphoglossoideae, in the Pteridophyte Phylogeny Group classification of 2016 (PPG I).

Taxonomy
Pleocnemia was first described by Carl Borivoj Presl in 1836.

Species
, the Checklist of Ferns and Lycophytes of the World and Plants of the World Online recognized the following species and hybrids:

Pleocnemia acuminata Holttum
Pleocnemia andaiensis (Baker) Holttum
Pleocnemia brongniartii (Bory) Holttum
Pleocnemia conjugata (Blume) C.Presl
Pleocnemia cumingiana C.Presl
Pleocnemia dahlii (Hieron.) Holttum
Pleocnemia elegans (Copel.) Holttum
Pleocnemia hemiteliiformis (Racib.) Holttum
Pleocnemia × intermedia Holttum
Pleocnemia irregularis (C.Presl) Holttum
Pleocnemia leuzeana (Gaudich.) C.Presl
Pleocnemia macrodonta (C.Presl ex Fée) Holttum
Pleocnemia megaphylla Holttum
Pleocnemia milnei E.Fourn.
Pleocnemia nesiotica (Holttum) H.G.Zhao & S.Y.Dong
Pleocnemia olivacea (Copel.) Holttum
Pleocnemia pleiotricha Holttum
Pleocnemia presliana Holttum
Pleocnemia seranensis Holttum
Pleocnemia siamensis X.G.Xu & Li Bing Zhang
Pleocnemia submembranacea (Hayata) Tagawa & K.Iwats.

References

Dryopteridaceae
Fern genera